Eriochilus dilatatus subsp. brevifolius, commonly known as the blunt-leaved bunny orchid, is a plant in the orchid family Orchidaceae and is endemic to Western Australia. It has a single small, smooth leaf with wavy edges and a pale red lower surface, and up to three greenish and white flowers with red or mauve markings. It is distinguished from the other subspecies by the colour of the lower surface of its leaf and by its later flowering period.

Description
The leaf has a pale red lower surface and wavy edges. The flowers are greenish with reddish markings, except for the lateral sepals which are white. The labellum is prominently down-curved and has three lobes with scattered clusters of red and white hairs. Flowering occurs from March to June.

Taxonomy and naming
The blunt-leaved bunny orchid was first formally described in 2006 by Stephen Hopper and Andrew Brown from a specimen collected near the Murchison River. The subspecies epithet (brevifolius) is derived from the Latin words brevis meaning "short" and folium meaning "leaf".

Distribution and habitat
The blunt-leaved bunny orchid grows in scrub and mallee-heath between Cataby and the Murchison River in the Geraldton Sandplains and Yalgoo biogeographic regions.

Conservation
Eriochilus dilatatus subsp. brevifolius is classified as "not threatened" by the Western Australian Government Department of Parks and Wildlife.

References 

dilatatus
Orchids of Western Australia
Endemic orchids of Australia
Plants described in 1840
Endemic flora of Western Australia
Taxa named by Stephen Hopper